Arabs in Serbia are mostly expatriates from a range of Arab countries, particularly Libya, Lebanon, Syria, Palestine, Iraq, and Jordan; and also small groups from Egypt, Algeria, Tunisia, Morocco,  and Sudan. Lebanese and Syrian citizens were the first Arabs to arrive in modern Serbia. In the 1970s and 1980s, many students from Iraq and Syria were enrolled at the University of Belgrade. More recently, as a result of the Arab Spring and the Syrian Civil War, large numbers of Arabs are transiting Serbia as refugees, trying to immigrate to Western Europe.

Libyan citizens
There is a small community of Libyans in Serbia, mainly residing in Belgrade. There has been a Libyan School in Belgrade since 1997, which has since expanded in 2012 to cater to the community.

Iraqi citizens
Most of the Iraqis in Serbia are educated people, and they view Serbia as a "friendly and brotherly" country.

Syrian citizens
By the first half of 2013, 432 citizens of Syria had requested asylum in Serbia.

Culture
Community members adhere to Islam (see also Islam in Serbia) and Eastern Christianity.

People
Muhamed Jusufspahić, mufti, born in Belgrade; Bosniak father and Egyptian mother
Josif Al Said, MMA fighter, born in Belgrade; Jordanian father and Serbian mother
Amjad Migati, Serbian Politician and Member of the Serbian Radical Party; Jordanian
Nedal Halil, Businessman and CEO of Aman; Jordanian
Mohammed Dahlan, Politician and former leader of Fatah in Gaza, Palestinian
 Jawad Aldroubi, a doctor born in Syria. Studied Medicine in University of Novi Sad. Specializing in Paediatrics.

See also

Iraq–Serbia relations
Palestine–Serbia relations
Serbia–Syria relations
Serbia–United Arab Emirates relations
Arab diaspora
Lebanese diaspora
Syrian diaspora
Palestinian diaspora
Moroccan diaspora
Iraqi diaspora
Egyptian diaspora

References

 
Ethnic groups in Serbia
Serbia
Middle Eastern diaspora in Serbia
Islam in Serbia
Muslim communities in Europe